Drakon may refer to:

Arts and entertainment
 Drakon Empire, a fictional group from Sonic the Comic
 Drakon (novel), a novel by S. M. Stirling
 Constantine Drakon, a fictional character from DC comics
 Lord Drakkon, Character in Mighty Morphin Power Rangers Shattered Grid

Other uses
 Draco (lawgiver), an ancient Greek lawgiver infamous for his harsh penalties
 DRAKON, a programming language
 3M7 Drakon, a Soviet missile tank

See also
 Dragon (Ancient Greek drakôn δράκων)
 Draco (disambiguation)